Named the Greatest Briton of all time in a 2002 poll, and widely regarded as being among the most influential people in British history, Winston Churchill has been regularly portrayed in film, television, radio and other media. The depictions range from minor character to the biographical centerpiece, exceeding 30 films, more than two dozen television shows, several stage productions, and countless books.

Film
{| class="wikitable sortable"
! Year !! Country !! Title !! Actor !! Notes
|-
| 1935 ||  || Royal Cavalcade || C.M. Hallard ||
|-
| 1941 ||  || Ohm Kruger || Otto Wernicke ||
|-
| 1943 ||  || Mission to Moscow || Dudley Field Malone ||
|-
| 1949 || rowspan="3" |  || Stalingradskaya bitva I || rowspan="3" | Viktor Stanitsyn ||
|-
| rowspan="2" | 1950 || The Lights of Baku || 
|-
| The Fall of Berlin ||
|-
| 1951 ||  || An American in Paris || Dudley Field Malone ||
|-
| 1952 ||  || Nezabyvaemyy god 1919 (Unforgettable 1919) || Viktor Stanitsyn ||
|-
| 1956 || rowspan="3" |  || The Man Who Never Was || Peter Sellers || Voice only
|-
| 1960 || The Siege of Sidney Street || Jimmy Sangster ||
|-
| 1965 || Operation Crossbow || Patrick Wymark ||
|-
| 1970 ||      || Liberation || Yuri Durov ||
|-
| 1972 ||  || Young Winston || Simon Ward ||
|-
| rowspan="2" | 1973 ||  || The Battle of Sutjeska || Orson Welles ||
|-
|  || Days of Betrayal || Jan Vitek || 
|-
| 1976 ||  || The Eagle Has Landed || Leigh Dilley || Plays a stand-in for the real Churchill
|-
| 1978 ||  || Picassos äventyr || Sune Mangs ||
|-
| 1979 ||  || Sekret Enigmy || Józef Zacharewicz || 
|-
| 1983 ||  || Le bourreau des cœurs || René Douglas ||
|-
| 1984 ||  || Katastrofa w Gibraltarze || Wlodzimierz Wiszniewski ||
|-
| 1987 ||  || Jane and the Lost City || Richard Huggett ||
|-
| 1989 ||  || Casablanca Express || John Evans ||
|-
| 1990 ||     || Stalingrad || Ronald Lacey ||
|-
| 1994 ||  || Caro dolce amore || John Evans || 
|-
| 2000 ||  || Shaheed Uddham Singh: Alais Ram Mohammad Singh Azad || Joe Lamb ||
|-
| 2002 || rowspan="3" |  || Two Men Went to War || David Ryall ||
|-
| 2004 || Churchill: The Hollywood Years || Christian Slater || 
|-
| 2005 || Allegiance || Mel Smith ||
|-
| 2009 ||   || Inglourious Basterds || Rod Taylor || 
|-
| rowspan="2" | 2010 ||  || The King's Speech || Timothy Spall ||
|-
|  || Paradox || Alan C. Peterson ||
|-
| rowspan="3" | 2012 || rowspan="4" |  || FDR: American Badass! || Paul Willson ||
|-
| The ABCs of Death || Torgny Gerhard Aanderaa || "H is for Hydro-Electric Diffusion"
|-
| Bad Ass || Tyler Tuione ||
|-
| 2015 || Queen of the Desert || Christopher Fulford || 
|-
| 2016 || rowspan="2" |  || Churchill's Secret || Michael Gambon ||
|-
| rowspan="3" | 2017 || Churchill || Brian Cox ||
|-
|   || Darkest Hour || Gary Oldman ||
|-
|  || Viceroy's House || Gerry George ||
|-
| rowspan="2" | 2018 || rowspan="2" |  || Suffragette || Ray Burnet ||
|-
| The Battle for Britain's Heroes || Gerry George || 
|-
| rowspan="2" | 2019 ||  || The Professor and the Madman || Brendan Patricks ||
|-
|  || Operation Cicero || Gerry George || 
|-
| 2020 ||  || The Good Traitor || Nicholas Blane ||
|-
| rowspan="3" | 2021 ||  || Sardar Udham || Tom Hudson ||
|-
|  || Audience u královny || Vladislav Benes || 
|-
|  || Operation Mincemeat || Simon Russell Beale ||
|-
|}

Television

Theatre
 Never So Good (2007) – Ian McNeice (premiere run in 2007)
  Turning Point  (2009) - Matthew Marsh
 Three Days in May (2011) – Warren Clarke (premiere run in 2011)
 The Audience (2013, London) – Edward Fox (replacing Robert Hardy, who withdrew prior to press night for health reasons)
 The Audience (2015, Broadway) – Dakin Matthews
 Sylvia (2018) - Delroy Atkinson

Music
 The Kinks recorded "Mr. Churchill Says" for their 1969 album Arthur.
 The YouTube series Epic Rap Battles of History featured Dan Bull as Churchill in its fifth season; Churchill battled against Theodore Roosevelt, played by EpicLLOYD.
 Iron Maiden included parts of Churchill's famous speech "We shall fight on the beaches" in live versions of the song "Aces High" from the 1984 album Powerslave.
 "Oliver's Army" by Elvis Costello
 "Stop the Cavalry" by Jona Lewie

Radio
 Peter Sellers included Churchill as his standard PM for The Goon Show. Churchill is depicted as he was during World War II. In The Goon Show, he is of course treated humorously, having a very African foreign secretary called Basil (played by Ray Ellington in Red Bladder mode). In addition he is responsible for supporting Neddie Seagoon's harebrained plans for long-range, jet-propelled guided NAAFI's, atomic dustbins, and throwing batter puddings at Clement Attlee.
 Churchill's Other Lives, documentary series, played by Roger Allam (2011)

Literature
 H.G. Wells, in his 1933 novel The Shape of Things to Come - a forecast of the future as it seemed to Wells on the basis of the 1934 situation - assumed that Winston Churchill's career was over and that he would have no active role to play in the Second World War, which Wells foresaw as breaking out in 1940, lasting until 1950 and culminating in the collapse of all parties to the conflict and a breakdown of European civilization. Wells assumed that Randolph Churchill, Winston's son, would take part in a valiant but doomed effort to avert the war, delivering a "brilliant pacifist speech [which] echoed throughout Europe", but failed to end the war.
 The protagonist of George Orwell's 1949 novel Nineteen Eighty Four is named Winston Smith. He is mentioned as being about forty years old in 1984, i.e. he was born in the last years of WWII and presumably was named for Winston Churchill.
 Churchill is a significant character in the 1995 novel Redemption by Leon Uris
 Players, a 1999 Doctor Who novel by Terrance Dicks
 The Hundred-Year-Old Man Who Climbed Out the Window and Disappeared (2012)
 Churchill is mentioned in the Grandpa's Great Escape, 2016 by David Walliams

There are various alternative history works depicting a Nazi German victory or an otherwise widely different course of WWII posit various ultimate fates for Churchill:
 In Len Deighton's 1978 SS-GB, Churchill refuses to escape Britain even when Nazi victory is certain. He is captured by the Nazis and executed, at his last moment defiantly making the V for Victory sign. 
 In James P. Hogan's 1985 The Proteus Operation, Lord Halifax cravenly surrenders to the Nazis without fighting. Churchill, holding no official position of any kind, organizes some of his neighbors for a foredoomed defiance, confronting the German soldiers who arrive in their countryside with an assortment of shotguns and all of them getting killed. Time travelers from a bleak world of the 1970s return to 1939, contact Churchill and Roosevelt and provide information enabling them to do better and defeat the Nazis, creating the history we know. 
 In Leo Rutman's 1990 Clash of Eagles, Churchill escapes via the Bahamas. When the Nazis follow up their conquest of Britain with an invasion of the US, occupying New York City and much of the East Coast, the exile Churchill urges the Americans to go on resisting.  
 A similar role is given to Churchill also in the Nazi-dominated 1960s of Robert Harris' 1992 Fatherland. Churchill and most of the British Royal Family escape to Canada where he leads a Government in exile.
 In Harry Turtledove's Worldwar series (1994-2004), in 1942 Extraterrestrials invaded Earth, forcing humans to stop fighting each other and unite to face the common threat. Churchill managers to beat off a large scale  Extraterrestrial invasion of Britain, but must concede the reptile invaders - who prefer warm climates - in permanent occupation of most of the British Empire.  
 In Newt Gingrich's 1945, Germany did not declare war on the US in 1941. In 1945 two separate wars end, the US victorious against Japan but the Nazis victorious in Europe. Britain remains unoccupied but its situation is precarious. In 1946 Churchill faces a land invasion of Britain, headed by Rommel, and bombings much more severe than the 1940 London Blitz, and is desperately begging for American help (1995)
 Harry Turtledove's Southern Victory series (1997-2007) is based on an earlier diversion from the history we know - the Confederacy winning the American Civil War and from 1862 becoming a fully recognized sovereign nation. In this history, the Entente is defeated by the Central Powers in the First Great War of 1914-1917. In 1935, the Conservatives led by Churchill go into coalition with the Silvershirts and by 1941, they declare war on a Germany still ruled by a Kaizer. Under these circumstances, Churchill ends up in an uneasy alliance with a Hitler-analogue - Jake Featherston, demagogue dictator of the Confederacy, who is involved in a wholesale genocide of Blacks.
 Winston's War (2002) - Michael Dobbs
 Never Surrender (2003) - Michael Dobbs 
 In Harry Turtledove's 2003 In the Presence of Mine Enemies, Churchill and the remnants of the British Army resist to the bitter end, getting much of London destroyed and such landmarks as Buckingham Palace, Big Ben and Saint Paul's Cathedral disappearing forever. Churchill is killed, gun in hand - refusing to surrender and fighting among the last remaining defenders.
 Churchill's Hour (2004) - Michael Dobbs
 Churchill's Triumph (2005) - Michael Dobbs
 In Jo Walton's Farthing (2006) in this alternative history Rudolf Hess's flight to Scotland in May 1941 manages to successfully negotiate peace terms with the United Kingdom, mainly because the United States never gets involved with the conflict, this is because Imperial Japan never attacks Pearl Harbor, resulting in Churchill being removed from office and the British Empire pulling out of the war.
 In Harry Turtledove's The War That Came Early, right-wing elements in the British Government - seeking to accept Rudolf Hess's proposals, stop fighting the Nazis and rather join them in a war against the Soviet Union - assassinate Churchill in a "traffic accident", knowing he would never agree to such a step (2009-2014)
 In C. J. Sansom's 2012 Dominion, in the 1950s in which the Nazis occupy Great Britain through a puppet government, an ageing Churchill is leader-in-exile of the British resistance movement.   
 In Philip K. Dick's The Man in the High Castle Where the Axis Powers won World War II. The story occurs in 1962, fifteen years after the end of the war in 1947, and depicts the political intrigues between Imperial Japan and Nazi Germany as they rule the partitioned United States. The Grasshopper Lies Heavy, by Hawthorne Abendsen, the story within the story, United Kingdom contributes more to the Allied war effort, leading to joint British and Russian forces capturing Berlin, the British Empire becomes militaristic, anti-American post war, and begins a cold war against the United States, Churchill remains Prime Minister until his death.
 In Guy Saville's The Afrika Reich the United Kingdom is defeated by Nazi Germany during the Dunkirk Campaign, Churchill resigned, Lord Halifax becomes Prime Minister and signs a non-aggression pact with Germany ending the war.
 In Guy Walters' The Leader (2003), King Edward VIII never abdicates, marries Wallis Simpson, leading to Oswald Mosley winning the 1935 election, allying the United Kingdom with the Axis Powers. Churchill and other anti-Nazi politicians are imprisoned on the Isle of Man.
 In Murray Davies Collaborator(2004) Nazis conquer the United Kingdom and the Irish Free State, Churchill along with the British Royal Family flee to Canada where he leads a government in exile.
 In Philip Kerr's Hitler's Peace (2005) Adolf Hitler, realising he is going to lose the war, tries to negotiate peace with Franklin D. Roosevelt, Joseph Stalin, Churchill refuses to listen and will only except unconditional surrender.
Miscellaneous
 The 2012 Summer Olympics opening ceremony featured an animated version of Churchill's statue in Parliament Square, which James Bond and the Queen fly over in a helicopter: as they salute him, he raises his cane in response. It also featured an appearance from Timothy Spall as Winston Churchill.
 Churchill was featured in Ubisoft's Assassin's Creed: Syndicate as an ally to Lydia Frye.
 Churchill was supposed to appear in the 1941 film Citizen Kane with Charles Foster Kane during the News on the March sequence but was cut due to runtime.
 A paperweight likeness of Churchill, based on a portrait by Dora Marr, was produced in a limited number by Baccarat in 1954.
 Churchill is one of the main characters in the webseries Super Science Friends. He assembles a team of famous scientists to win World War II. He is voiced by Adam Shaheen.
 A fictionalised Churchill appeared in the Strike Witches series.
 Doctor Who: The Churchill Years'' is a series of audio drama released by Big Finish Productions, Ian McNeice reprises his role as Churchill from the TV show.
 Churchill is currently being portrayed by British actor David Payne in a solo performance tour in the United States.

References

External links
 Winston Churchill – character page on the IMDb

 
Winston Churchill